The simple station Calle 127 is part of the TransMilenio mass-transit system of Bogotá, Colombia, which opened in the year 2000.

Location

The station is located in northern Bogotá, specifically on Autopista Norte with Calle 125.

It serves the Santa Bárbara Occidental and La Calleja neighbourhoods. It is the nearest station to the shopping districts of Avenida Calle 127 (Avenida Rodrigo Lara Bonilla) and Avenida Carrera 19.

Many passengers use this station to go to Unicentro, the second-largest mall in the city.

History

After the opening of the Portal de Usme in early 2001, the Autopista Norte line was opened. This station was added as a northerly expansion of that line, which was completed with the opening of the Portal del Norte later that year.

The station is named Calle 127 due to its proximity to that road.

Station Services

Old trunk services

Main line service

Feeder routes

This station does not have connections to feeder routes.

Inter-city service

This station does not have inter-city service.

See also
Bogotá
TransMilenio
List of TransMilenio Stations

References

External links
TransMilenio

TransMilenio